The Sony Xperia 5 III is an Android smartphone manufactured by Sony. Part of Sony's Xperia series, the phone was announced on  April 14, 2021, along with the larger Xperia 1 III and the mid-range Xperia 10 III.

Design
The Xperia 5 III retains Sony's signature square design that is seen on previous Xperia phones. It is built similarly to the Xperia 1 III, using anodized aluminum for the frame and Corning Gorilla Glass 6 for the screen and back panel, as well as IP65 and IP68 certifications for water resistance. The build has a pair of symmetrical bezels on the top and the bottom, where the front-facing dual stereo speakers are placed. The left side of the phone contains a slot for a SIM card and a microSDXC card, while the right side contains a fingerprint reader embedded into the power button, a volume rocker and a shutter button. A dedicated Google Assistant button is located between the power and shutter buttons. The earpiece, front-facing camera, notification LED and various sensors are housed in the top bezel. The bottom edge has the primary microphone and USB-C port; the rear cameras are arranged in a vertical strip. The phone ships in three colors: Black, Green and Pink.

Specifications

Hardware
The Xperia 5 III is powered by the Qualcomm Snapdragon 888 SoC and an Adreno 660 GPU, accompanied by 8 GB of LPDDR5 RAM. It has 128 or 256 GB of UFS internal storage, which can be expanded up to 1 TB via the microSD card slot with a hybrid dual-SIM setup. The display is a 6.1-inch 1080p (2520 × 1080) HDR OLED with a 21:9 aspect ratio, resulting in a pixel density of 449 ppi. It features a 120 Hz refresh rate, and is capable of displaying one billion colors. The battery capacity is 4500 mAh; USB Power Delivery 3.0 is supported at 30W over USB-C, although it lacks wireless charging capabilities. The device includes a 3.5mm audio jack as well as an active external amplifier.

Camera
The Xperia 5 III has three 12 MP rear-facing cameras and an 8 MP front-facing camera. The rear cameras consist of a wide-angle lens (24 mm f/1.7), an ultra wide angle lens (16 mm f/2.2), and a variable telephoto lens that can switch between 70 mm and 105 mm  with 3× or 4.4× optical zoom; each uses ZEISS' T✻ (T-Star) anti-reflective coating. Software improvements include real-time Eye AF and Optical SteadyShot.

Software
The Xperia 5 III runs on Android 11. Sony has also paired the phone's camera tech with a "Pro" mode developed by Sony's camera division CineAlta, whose features take after Sony's Alpha camera lineup.

References

Notes

Android (operating system) devices
Flagship smartphones
Sony smartphones
Mobile phones introduced in 2021
Mobile phones with multiple rear cameras
Mobile phones with 4K video recording